The Maids of Wilko is a 1979 Polish drama film directed by Andrzej Wajda.  It was nominated for the Academy Award for Best Foreign Language Film at the 52nd Academy Awards. "Maids" is used in the sense of "maidens", hence another translation could be The Maidens of Wilko.

Plot
At the age of 40, Wiktor Ruben (Daniel Olbrychski) returns to the family property (Wilko) where he'd spent his late teens/early twenties as a tutor of young sisters. Now they are all adult women - mostly wives and mothers. Wiktor discovers that Fela, once the closest to him, has been dead for some time; the other sisters aren't keen to talk about her, and her grave is mostly forgotten. He is also disappointed by how all the women have changed. Julia (Anna Seniuk), now a mother of two, doesn't resemble his first object of desire and doesn't show him the affection he might have expected. Jola (Maja Komorowska), seemingly unhappy in her marriage, chases him and makes fun of him until he doesn't bring the painful memories of the past. Kazia (Krystyna Zachwatowicz), a divorcee - and thus treated as less worthy than the others - is the most demanding partner of his intellectual reflections, while Zosia (Stanisława Celińska) is - as always - distant and outspoken. That leaves him with Tunia (Christine Pascal), who was only a child when he previously knew her, and who now resembles Fela. Wiktor spends time in Wilko, but isn't able to see that his return restored once forgotten dreams and hopes to the sisters.

Cast
 Daniel Olbrychski as Wiktor Ruben
 Anna Seniuk as Julcia
 Maja Komorowska as Jola
 Stanisława Celińska as Zosia
 Krystyna Zachwatowicz as Kazia
 Christine Pascal as Tunia
 Zbigniew Zapasiewicz as Julcia's Husband
 Zofia Jaroszewska as Wiktor's Aunt
 Tadeusz Białoszczyński as Wiktor's Uncle
 Paul Guers as Jola's Husband (as Paul Dutron)

Possible reasons for the critical recognition
The film is based on a popular short story written in the early 1930s by famous Polish poet Jarosław Iwaszkiewicz who even appears as himself near the end of the movie. Andrzej Wajda previously filmed another short story of Iwaszkiewicz, The Birch Wood in 1970 and would go to film yet another, Sweet Rush, in 2009. This particular film features impressive cast, very good (although non-original) score (music of Karol Szymanowski, who was a friend and cousin of Jarosław Iwaszkiewicz) and is otherwise technically brilliant. It received some awards in Poland and was nominated for an Oscar which it lost to The Tin Drum (also starring Olbrychski). Much of this happened because of deliberately avoiding anything that would trigger censorship from the communist authorities that governed Poland at that time.  It is quite possible that the whole production was the results of games of influence inside the government-controlled film monopoly in Poland. It appears that the director Andrzej Wajda had built around himself enough buffer space to produce a clearly anti-communist film just two years later, Man of Iron.

See also
 List of submissions to the 52nd Academy Awards for Best Foreign Language Film
 List of Polish submissions for the Academy Award for Best Foreign Language Film

References

External links
 

1979 films
1979 drama films
Polish drama films
1970s Polish-language films
Films directed by Andrzej Wajda